Murasoli is an Indian Tamil language newspaper started by M. Karunanidhi.

Murasoli was started in Tiruvarur on 10 August 1942, during the World War II, by 18-year old M. Karunanidhi. Its earliest editions were in form of handwritten notices authored by Karunanidhi under the pen name "Cheran". Until 1944, it was issued as a leaflet. Its publication had to be stopped in the mid-1940s due to lack of paper. It resumed as a weekly magazine on 14 January 1948. The newspaper headquarters were moved to Chennai in 1954. From 17 September 1960, it has been published as a daily.
As of 2017, the newspaper has a circulation of 70,000 copies.

References

Newspapers published in Chennai
Tamil-language newspapers published in India
Dravida Munnetra Kazhagam
Newspapers established in 1942
Indian companies established in 1942